Quentin Rew (born 16 July 1984) is a race walker from New Zealand. At the 2011 World Athletics Championships Rew finished 24th in the 50 kilometres race walk.  He represented New Zealand in the 50 km race walk at the 2012 Summer Olympics, originally finishing 30th. With the subsequent ban for a doping offence of Igor Yerokhin (who finished fifth) Rew's placing would be raised to 29th. At the 2015 World Championships in Athletics Rew finished 10th in the 50 kilometres walk in 3:48:48. At the XXI Gold Coast Commonwealth Games, Rew finished 5th in the Men's 20 kilometres walk, with a time of 1:21:47. In 2021, Rew finished 16th in the men's 50 kilometres walk at the 2020 Summer Olympics with a time of 3:57:33.

References

External links 
 
 
 
 
 

1984 births
Living people
New Zealand male racewalkers
Olympic athletes of New Zealand
Athletes (track and field) at the 2012 Summer Olympics
Athletes (track and field) at the 2016 Summer Olympics
Athletes (track and field) at the 2020 Summer Olympics
Commonwealth Games competitors for New Zealand
Athletes (track and field) at the 2018 Commonwealth Games
Athletes (track and field) at the 2022 Commonwealth Games
World Athletics Championships athletes for New Zealand
People educated at St. Patrick's College, Wellington